2020 Robert-Bourassa is a 104.0 m tall skyscraper located in Montreal, Quebec, Canada.

It was built in 1974 and hosts a number of tenants, including Home Trust, Income Access, Intact Financial, and Monster.ca.  The building previously served as the headquarters for Axa Canada, which comprised a number of subsidiaries of the French-based insurance company Axa, and was acquired by Intact in 2011. 

The building is located at 2020 Robert-Bourassa Boulevard between De Maisonneuve Boulevard & President Kennedy Ave, in Downtown Montreal. It is directly connected to the McGill Station of the Montreal Metro's Green Line.

See also
List of tallest buildings in Montreal

External links
 Building management home page
 Tour AXA at SkyscraperPage

References

Axa Tower
Skyscraper office buildings in Canada
Office buildings completed in 1974
Downtown Montreal